Closterocoris elegans is an extinct species of jumping tree bug in the family Miridae.

References

Miridae
Articles created by Qbugbot
Insects described in 1890
Florissant Formation